Rhynchaglaea perscitula is a species of moth of the family Noctuidae which is endemic to Taiwan.

References

Moths described in 2006
Endemic fauna of Taiwan
Insects of Taiwan
Cuculliinae